Akin Omotoso  (born 1974) is a Nigerian film director, writer, and actor. He is best known for directing the 2022 film Rise. Both his father Kole Omotoso and his sister Yewande Omotoso are also writers.

Early life and education 
Omotoso was born in Nigeria where he grew up in Ile Ife, Osun State. His family emigrated to South Africa in 1992 after his father, Kole Omotoso, took an academic appointment with the University of the Western Cape. This prompted Akin Omotoso to study at the same university, obtaining a diploma in speech and drama. His mother died in 2003.

Career
Omotoso ventured into entertainment while at the university. His acting debut was in Sunjata by Mark Fleishman. This also earned him a Fleur du Cap Award for Most Promising Student in 1995. He used the money from acting in the play to direct his first short films, The Kiss of Milk, The Nightwalkers, and The Caretaker. By 1999, he wrote his first full-length film, entitled God is African. The film was released in 2003. He started a production company along with Robbie Thorpe and Kgomotso Matsunyane called T.O.M pictures in 2003.

Omotoso directed the television series Jacob's Cross on Africa Magic, M-Net and SABC between 2007 and 2013. In 2010, he began working on Tell Me Sweet Something; speaking about the script with Pulse Nigeria, he stated that Theodore Witchers′ Love Jones (1997) was the influence behind the film. Omotoso also noted that he received a grant from the African Women's Development Fund. The film earned him the best director award at the 2016 Africa Magic Viewers Choice Awards in Lagos State.

In an interview with Azania Mosaka, he described the South African film industry atmosphere as having an enabling environment for aspiring filmmakers. He particularly acknowledged funds from the Department of Trade and Industry and the National Film and Video Foundation (NFVF) that prepares film stakeholders for the industry.

In 2022, Omotoso directed Giannis Antetokounmpo biopic Rise (2022 film) for Disney which received generally positive reviews. Sourav Chakraborty of Sportskeeda found Rise to be an inspiring sports movie, stated Omotoso successfully provides an atmosphere of tension across his direction, and praised the performances of the cast members.

Filmography

See also
 List of Nigerian actors
 List of Nigerian film directors

References

External links

1974 births
People from Ife
Nigerian film directors
University of the Western Cape alumni
Living people
Akin
Yoruba filmmakers
Yoruba male actors
Nigerian people of Barbadian descent
Nigerian male film actors
21st-century Nigerian male actors
20th-century Nigerian male actors
Nigerian screenwriters
Nigerian film award winners
Male actors in Yoruba cinema